Korrey Emmeka Henry (born 28 November 1999) is an English semi-professional footballer who plays as a forward for Kingstonian.

Career
On 22 July 2018, following his release from West Ham United, Henry signed for League Two side Yeovil Town on a one-year contract. On 11 August 2018, Henry made his English Football League debut for Yeovil as a substitute in their 2–2 draw against Mansfield Town.

On 14 September 2018, Henry joined Southern League Premier Division South club Poole Town on an initial one-month loan deal.

On 1 February 2019, Henry had his contract with Yeovil terminated by mutual consent having only made five appearances for the club. Henry subsequently signed for National League side Braintree Town until the end of the season.

In June 2019 he signed for Bromley. He moved on loan to Welling United for one month in November 2019, scoring 4 goals in a 6–2 league win against former club Braintree Town on 16 November 2019. He returned to Bromley and made one appearance on 30 November 2019, before Welling confirmed on 13 December 2019, that Henry had joined the club on a permanent basis.

In September 2020, Henry signed for fellow National League South side Dulwich Hamlet.

Following a disruptive 2020–21 campaign due to the COVID-19 pandemic, in which he featured only five times for Dulwich, Henry opted to return to Braintree Town ahead of the 2021–22 season. Failing to make an appearance back at Braintree, Henry joined Leatherhead in September 2021. He moved on to league rivals Merstham on 13 October 2021. In July 2022, Henry joined Kingstonian.

Career statistics

References

1999 births
Living people
English footballers
Association football forwards
Black British sportspeople
West Ham United F.C. players
Yeovil Town F.C. players
Poole Town F.C. players
Braintree Town F.C. players
Bromley F.C. players
Welling United F.C. players
Dulwich Hamlet F.C. players
Leatherhead F.C. players
Merstham F.C. players
Kingstonian F.C. players
English Football League players
National League (English football) players
Southern Football League players
Isthmian League players